Mohammad Mahdi Faghihi (born March/April 1962 in Mashhad) is an Iranian newspaper publisher.

In 1999, he was the newspaper publisher for Entekhab. In 2004, after he left Entekhab, he took on several smaller posts and private sector jobs. During the elections, he seriously criticized the government, strongly supported by Mir Hossein Mousavi. He was commended for transforming the political opposition since the first newsbreak of widespread election fraud, for his public outcry.

For two months after the election these comments were censored. The Ahmadinejad government filtered Entekhab news 12 times, and Tehran prosecutor Saeed Mortazavi was arrested, but the site has since restarted its activities.

References

1962 births
Living people
Iranian newspaper publishers (people)